This is a list of members of the House of Representatives of the 47th Parliament of Australia (2022–2025). They were elected in the 2022 Australian federal election or subsequent by-elections.

Members

Leadership

Presiding officer

Government leadership

Opposition leadership

Current party standings
.

Breakdown by state and territory

Notes

References 

Members of Australian parliaments by term
21st-century Australian politicians
Australian House of Representatives, List of members of
2020s politics-related lists
Australia